The following article is a summary of the 2012 football season in Kenya, which was the 49th competitive season in its history.

Domestic leagues

Promotion and relegation

Promoted to Premier League
 Muhoroni Youth
 Oserian

Promoted to Division One
 Coast United
 G.F.C. 105
 Green Berets
 Kakamega Homeboyz
 West Kenya Sugar (promoted as Kabrass United)
 Zoo Kericho

Relegated from Premier League
 Bandari
 Congo JMJ United

Relegated from Division One
 Annex 07
 Kiambaa United
 Makarios
 Nanyuki
 Opera
 Real Kisumu
 Strathmore University

Managerial changes

Premier League

Division One

Premier League

The 2012 Kenyan Premier League began on February 11, 2012 and ended on November 10, 2012, with a break that lasted from May 20, 2012 to June 23, 2012.

On 21 August, the Kenyan Premier League and East African Breweries signed a KSh.170 million/= (US$2.02 million; £1.28 million sterling; €1.62 million) deal for the renaming of the league to the Tusker Premier League, making it the most lucrative deal in Kenyan football history. On 18 October, Puma signed a deal with the league for KSh.10 million/= (US$117,275; £73,242 stg.; €90,052) to make them the official ball supplier for the league and its clubs with immediate effect.

Women's Premier League

The 2012 Kenyan Women's Premier League began on March 3, 2012 and ended on October 7, 2012.

Relegated Sotik Super Stars had been highlighted as an incompetent team after losing 14−0 to three different teams: MOYAS Ladies, Mathare United and Matuu.

Division One

The Nationwide League had its name changed to FKF Division One at the beginning of the season.

The 2012 FKF Division One season began on March 3, 2012 and ended on November 18, 2012 in both Zone A and B.

Zone A
On 31 August 2012, Mathare Youth disbanded and therefore pulled out of the league, after which the FKF decided to scrap all of their second round results. This meant that all teams that had played against Mathare Youth had their points revoked or given back, depending on the results of the matches, and all upcoming fixtures involving Mathare Youth were cancelled.

Zone B

Domestic cups

President's Cup

The 2012 FKF President's Cup began on August 4, 2012 and ended on November 21, 2012. The FKF decided to change the quarter-final fixtures, meaning that A.F.C. Leopards and Kenya Revenue Authority were to now face Karuturi Sports and Sofapaka respectively.

Super Cup

The 2012 Kenyan Super Cup match was played on February 5, 2012 between Tusker, the 2011 Kenyan Premier League champions, and Gor Mahia, the 2011 FKL Cup winners. Tusker won 4−1 on penalties after the match ended 1−1 at full-time.

Top 8 Cup

The 2012 KPL Top 8 Cup began on March 14, 2012 and ended on August 19, 2012.

International club competitions

Champions League

The 2012 CAF Champions League began on February 18, 2012 and ended on November 11, 2012. Tusker qualified for participation in the tournament as 2011 Kenyan Premier League champions. They were knocked out on aggregate in the preliminary round by Armée Patriotique Rwandaise, who advanced to the first round.

Confederation Cup

The 2012 CAF Confederation Cup began on February 18, 2012 and ended on November 25, 2012. Gor Mahia qualified for participation in the tournament as 2011 FKL Cup champions. They were knocked out on aggregate in the preliminary round by Ferroviário de Maputo, who advanced to the first round. The Mozambican club had also requested to postpone the second leg by a week.

Kagame Interclub Cup

The 2012 Kagame Interclub Cup began on July 14, 2012 and ended on July 28, 2012. Tusker were invited to represent Kenya in the tournament as the 2011 Kenyan Premier League champions. They were knocked out in the group stage.

National teams

Men

World Cup qualification
The national team advanced to the second round of World Cup qualifications in Africa after beating Seychelles 7-0 on aggregate in the first round.

Africa Cup of Nations qualification
The national team participated in the first round of qualification to the 2013 Africa Cup of Nations. They beat Togo 2-1 in the first leg on 29 February. However, they were beaten 1-0 in the second leg on 17 June and lost on away goals rule. Therefore, they did not advance to the second round.

African Nations Championship qualification
The national team participated in the preliminary round of qualification for the 2014 African Nations Championship. The second leg was to be played on 5 January 2013.

CECAFA Cup

Kenya were to host the CECAFA Cup to be held at the end of the year, and it would've been the first time they host the tournament since 2009 and the sixth time overall. However, CECAFA Secretary General Nicholas Musonye announced that the tournament was to be hosted in Uganda and not Kenya.

Other matches
The following is a list of all other matches played by the Kenya men's team in 2012.

Women
The following is a list of all matches played by the Kenya women's team in 2012.

References

External links
Kenyan Premier League
Futaa - Kenyan Football Portal
KenyaFootball
Orange CAN 2013
2014 FIFA World Cup qualifiers - Africa
FIFA.com - Kenya fixtures and results